Sadhoke is a town of Tehsil Kamoke in Gujranwala District located on Grand Trunk Road N-5 in Punjab, Pakistan.

Agriculture 
Rice, wheat and trap nut are the basic crops cultivated in the area. Vegetables like ladyfinger, pea, etc. are also cultivated.

Health

Hospitals/Clinic 
Arshad Hospital Sadhoke 
Dr. Abdul Qayyum Clinic 
Dr. Hasan Aslam Medical Hall 
Dr. Ali Muhammad Clinic

Pharmacy 
Sayyed Medical Store  
Clinics Plus Pharmacy  
Doctor Plus Pharmacy  
Lasani Medical Store  
Khalid Medical Store

Laboratory 
Yaseen Lab Sadhoke  
Ali Muhammad Lab  
Arshad Hospital Lab

Transportation

Highways 
Sadhoke is located on GT Road (N5) mid of Lahore-Gujranwala. Another highway connects Sadhoke with Mianwali Bangla which is considered as an important link between Lahore and Pasrur. This road also connects Kamonki with a number of nearby villages and towns like Wando, Kotli Nawab, Nagal Doona Singh, Narang and Pasrur. Two more roads connect Sadhoke to Gujranwala-Sheikhupura-Road at Baigpure and Majochak.

Rail 
Sadhoke railway station is located about 2.33 km from the main town and is situated on  Karachi - Peshawer Railway Line,

Airport 
The nearest airport is Allama Iqbal International Airport about 55 km away, can be reached via N5 and M11.
The second nearer airport is Sialkot International Airport which is located about 78 km away.

Education 
The Educators School 
Allied School 
Govt. Boys School 
Govt. Girls School

Banks 
MCB Bank Limited (Raja Sadhoke Branch), ATM Active 24/7(60% reliable) (PH: 055-6665026) 
Meezan Bank Limited (Meezan Bank Sadhoke Branch) (ATM Out of Order) 
The Bank of Punjab (The Bank of Punjab Sadhoke Branch) (NO ATM) 
Allied Bank Limited (Allied Bank Sadhoke Branch) (NO ATM)

Climate
Sadhoke is in the northern hemisphere.
Summer starts here in May and ends in September. There are the months of summer: May, June, July, August, September.
The best time to visit are March, April, October.
The month with the highest relative humidity is August (77.01 %). The month with the lowest relative humidity is May (29.36 %).
The month with the highest number of rainy days is July (21.10 days). The month with the lowest number of rainy days is November (1.80 days).
Sadhoke's climate is classified as warm and temperate. When compared with winter, the summers have much more rainfall. This location is classified as Cwa by Köppen and Geiger. The average annual temperature is 23.8 °C | 74.8 °F in Sadhoke. Precipitation here is about 877 mm | 34.5 inch per year.

Villages in Sadhoke Union Council
Sadhoke, Raja, Drajke, Manhais

References 

 Gujranwala District